Emma Bonino  (born 9 March 1948) is an Italian politician. A senator for Rome, she served as Minister of Foreign Affairs from 2013 to 2014. Previously, she was a Member of the European Parliament and a member of the Chamber of Deputies. She served in the government of Italy as minister of international trade from 2006 to 2008.

Bonino is a leading member of the Italian Radicals, a political party which describes itself "liberale, liberista, and libertario", where liberista denotes economic liberalism and libertario a form of cultural liberalism concerning moral issues, with some ideological connection with historical left-libertarianism. She graduated in modern languages and literature from Bocconi University in Milan in 1972. A veteran legislator in Italian politics and an activist for various reform policies, she was elected six times as deputy and two times as senator. 
She is the leader of More Europe, a liberal, European federalist party list she launched in December 2017, ahead of the 2018 Italian general election.

Personal life 
Bonino never married nor bore children, even succumbing to the Italian authorities in 1975 after having an illegal abortion. She fostered children, but never successfully became pregnant, despite attempts using artificial insemination.

She graduated at Bocconi University in literature with a master thesis on Malcolm X's autobiography.

Bonino is a godmother of Countess Luana, elder daughter of Prince Friso and Princess Mabel of Orange-Nassau.

On 12 January 2015, she announced on Radio Radicale she was suffering from lung cancer and was being treated with chemotherapy, though she also stated she was not abandoning her political activity.
On 21 May of the same year, on the same radio station, she announced her cancer was in complete remission.

National political career

Bonino was elected to the Italian Chamber of Deputies in 1976 and reelected in 1979, 1983, 1987, 1992, 1994 and 2006. In 1975, she founded the Information Centre on Sterilisation and Abortion and promoted the referendum which led to the legalisation of abortion in Italy. In 1986, she was among the promoters of a referendum against nuclear energy that led to the rejection of a civil nuclear energy programme in Italy.

On 17 May 2006, Bonino was appointed as minister for international trade in the cabinet of Romano Prodi. She resigned from office on 7 May 2008 when she had been elected vice president of the Senate the previous day. In 2008, at the elections of 13 and 14 April, she was elected to a seat in the Senate, the second parliamentary chamber, on the list of the Democratic Party for the Piedmont constituency.

On 28 April 2013, she was sworn in as foreign minister in the government led by Enrico Letta.

In June 2017, public opinion polls of her stood at 43 percent, second only to prime minister Paolo Gentiloni. Despite the positive public opinion, her party falls short of the 3 percent required for a seat in Parliament. In response, she has adopted the slogan "Love Me Less, Vote Me More."

Bonino was elected to the Senate of the Republic in the constituency of Rome – Gianicolense district at the 2018 general election.

On September 25, 2022 at the Italian Political Elections, Emma Bonino was aborted in the election for senate seat(Source:https://www.interno.gov.it ; Results:Party: +Europa;
Votes: 793.925; 2,83%) .

International political career

Bonino was elected to the European Parliament in 1979 and re-elected in 1984 and 1999. She served as the Secretary of the Transnational Radical Party in 1993–94 and the party's president in 1991–1993. In October 1994, she was appointed head of the Italian Government delegation to the UN General Assembly for the "Moratorium on death penalty" initiative. From 1994 to 1999, she was European Commissioner responsible for Consumer Policy, Fisheries and the European Community Humanitarian Office (ECHO). In 1997, her field of competence was widened to include consumer health protection and food safety.

On 15 March 1999, together with all the Santer Commission, she resigned due to the accusations of fraud and mismanagement against commissioner Édith Cresson. The final report however leveled charges against most commissioners, including Bonino herself. In November 2002, she was appointed Head of the Italian Government delegation at the Inter-governmental Conference of the Community of Democracies in Seoul.

Along with Marco Pannella, another member of the Radical Party, Bonino has fought numerous battles for civil rights and individual liberty, mainly concerned with divorce, the legalisation of abortion, the legalisation of drugs, and for sexual and religious freedoms. She has fought for an end to capital punishment, against female genital mutilation, and the eradication of world hunger. In 1975, Bonino funded the information centre for abortion (CISA), and in 1997 she supported the international movement condemning the discrimination of females in Afghanistan, Un Fiore per le Donne di Kabul (A Flower for the Women of Kabul). Bonino is also a champion of the recognition of women's rights in the countries of the African Union through the Maputo protocol. She is a founder of the nongovernmental organizations Non c'è Pace senza Giustizia (No Peace Without Justice), which supports the international protection and promotion of human rights and democracy, and Nessuno Tocchi Caino (Let None Strike Cain), which is an international league that fights for the abolition of the death penalty.

In June 1999, she obtained a historic percentage of votes (8.5%) in the European elections (vs. the usual 2–3% that Radicals got in the previous and subsequent elections). Her list (Lista Bonino) won seven of 78 Italian seats in this election.

Bonino supported the NATO intervention in Kosovo in the spring of 1999. From 1999 to 2004, the Lista Bonino was non-affiliated, as it was founded with a claim to not adhere to the traditional centre-left versus centre-right politics, rather remaining in the middle to maximize any potential bargaining power. In the case Emma Bonino and Others v Parliament and Council (Case T-40/04), the Emma Bonino List contested before the Court of Justice of the European Union that its exclusion from Community funding due to not qualifying as a party on the 'European level' was discriminatory. The court dismissed this argument as inadmissible, establishing that measures do not necessarily need to legally affect an applicant in order for the case to directly affect them. Since 2004, it is part of the ALDE group.

In 2002, Bonino in cooperation with the Associazione Italiana Donne per lo Sviluppo (AIDOS, Italian Association for the Development of Women), called an Italian Parliament meeting to discuss genital mutilation. Bonino led the ceremonies, which gathered medical experts, ambassadors, and politicians to review graphic information about the practice of female genital mutilation in African countries. During this meeting, Bonino recounted her travels through Somalia, Egypt, Tanzania, The Gambia, and Ethiopia, where she learned about these rural practices by meeting women who participated in projects to stop them. Many African women who suffered from genital mutilation discussed there firsthand experiences. At the conclusion of the meeting, the Prime Minister Berlusconi congratulated Bonino on her accomplishments in this cause and presented the leader of AIDOS with a check for the European Campaign.

In December 2001, she moved to Cairo with the objective of learning the Arabic language and culture. In March 2003, she started a daily review of the Arabic press on Radical Radio. In January 2004, she organized the "Regional Conference on Democracy, Human Rights and the role of the International Penal Court", the first for an Arabic country. She is currently a board member of the Arab Democracy Foundation.

Bonino was a board member of DARA until December 2012. In 2016, she was appointed by Erik Solheim, the Chairman of the Development Assistance Committee, to serve on the High Level Panel on the Future of the Development Assistance Committee under the leadership of Mary Robinson.

Bonino writes opinion editorials and commentaries for both the Inter Press Service News Agency and Project Syndicate, discussing contemporary international issues including Syrian refugees affecting Europe, abolishing the death penalty, relations between Iran and Europe, and the poor treatment of the indigenous people of South East Asia.

Philanthropy and charitable causes
Bonino is a member of the eminent international Council of Patrons of the Asian University for Women (AUW) in Chittagong, Bangladesh. The University, which is the product of foundational partnerships (Bill and Melinda Gates Foundation, Open Society Foundation, IKEA Foundation, etc) and regional cooperation, serves extraordinarily talented women from 15 countries across Asia and the Middle East.

During an interview published by the Italian daily Corriere della Sera on 8 February 2016, Pope Francis defined Bonino as one of the nation’s "forgotten greats", comparing her to great historical figures such as Konrad Adenauer and Robert Schuman.

Recognition

Knight Grand Cross of the Order of Merit of the Italian Republic – awarded on 21 December 2015

In 1999 Bonino was one of the two winners of the North-South Prize, an award that honors individuals with accomplishment in the protection of human rights, pluralistic democracy, and improvement of North-South relations.

For her battles and engagements with controversial issues, her engagement in the promotion of human rights and civil rights in the world, she received the "Open Society Prize 2004" and "Prix Femmes d'Europe 2004" for Italy.

She received the America Award of the Italy-USA Foundation in 2013, and she was also recognized as one of the BBC's 100 women in this same year.

Electoral history

First-past-the-post elections

References

External links

 Woman in Decision-making: Interview with Emma Bonino
 Emma Bonino's syndicated op/ed column

|-

|-

|-

|-

1948 births
Living people
People from Bra, Piedmont
Radical Party (Italy) politicians
Italian Radicals politicians
Deputies of Legislature VII of Italy
Deputies of Legislature VIII of Italy
Deputies of Legislature IX of Italy
Deputies of Legislature X of Italy
Deputies of Legislature XI of Italy
Deputies of Legislature XII of Italy
Deputies of Legislature XV of Italy
Senators of Legislature XVI of Italy
Senators of Legislature XVIII of Italy
Politicians of Piedmont
Letta Cabinet
Candidates for President of Italy
Italian European Commissioners
Italian Radicals MEPs
MEPs for Italy 1979–1984
MEPs for Italy 1999–2004
MEPs for Italy 2004–2009
20th-century women MEPs for Italy
21st-century women MEPs for Italy
Italian libertarians
Italian abortion-rights activists
Women government ministers of Italy
Female foreign ministers
Women European Commissioners
BBC 100 Women
Italian women diplomats
Bocconi University alumni
Women members of the Chamber of Deputies (Italy)
Women members of the Senate of the Republic (Italy)